Divnoye is a rural locality (a selo) in Baltiysky District in Kaliningrad Oblast, Russia. Population:

References

Rural localities in Kaliningrad Oblast